Doddiana cyanifusalis is a species of snout moth. It was described by Hubert Marion in 1955 and is found on Madagascar.

References

Epipaschiinae
Moths described in 1955